Sharpsburg (ˈʃɑrpsbɝg) is a town in Coweta County, Georgia, United States. It is part of the Atlanta metropolitan area. Its population was 341 at the 2010 census.

History
The Georgia General Assembly incorporated Sharpsburg as a town in 1871. The community was named after Judge Elias Sharp, a local city commissioner.

Geography
Sharpsburg is located in eastern Coweta County at  (33.339337, -84.650155). The town of Turin is immediately to the southeast. Georgia State Route 16 runs through the southern part of Sharpsburg, leading west  to Newnan, the county seat, and southeast  to Senoia. GA 54 leads northeast  to Peachtree City.

Demographics

As of the census of 2000, there were 316 people, 125 households, and 86 families residing in the town. The racial makeup of the town was 94.94% White, 4.11% African American, 0.32% Native American, 0.32% from other races, and 0.32% from two or more races. Hispanic or Latino people of any race were 3.48% of the population.

There were 125 households, out of which 34.4% had children under the age of 18 living with them, 60.8% were married couples living together, 5.6% had a female householder with no husband present, and 31.2% were non-families. 25.6% of all households were made up of individuals, and 5.6% had someone living alone who was 65 years of age or older.  The average household size was 2.53 and the average family size was 3.08.

In the town, the population was spread out, with 25.6% under the age of 18, 5.7% from 18 to 24, 36.7% from 25 to 44, 25.0% from 45 to 64, and 7.0% who were 65 years of age or older. The median age was 34 years. For every 100 females, there were 100.0 males. For every 100 females age 18 and over, there were 104.3 males.

The median income for a household in the town was $55,000, and the median income for a family was $68,750. Males had a median income of $41,932 versus $26,250 for females. The per capita income for the town was $23,169.  None of the families and 2.4% of the population were living below the poverty line, including no under eighteens and 22.2% of those over 64.

Education
Public education in Sharpsburg is operated by Coweta County School System, with schools including East Coweta High School.

Private schools in the town include Trinity Christian School and Central Christian School.

Faith Lutheran Preschool is a preschool of Faith Lutheran Church in Sharpsburg.

Notable people
Keith Brooking, football player
Janet Dykman, Olympic archery champion
Brooke Hendrix, football player
Allan Kayser, actor
Josh Andrew Koenig, actor
Rusty Stevens, actor
Lynn Westmoreland, politician

References

Towns in Coweta County, Georgia
Towns in Georgia (U.S. state)